This is a timeline of events related to the Anglophone Crisis. This entry is divided into the following articles:

Timeline of the Anglophone Crisis (2017)
Timeline of the Anglophone Crisis (2018)
Timeline of the Anglophone Crisis (2019)
Timeline of the Anglophone Crisis (2020)
Timeline of the Anglophone Crisis (2021)
Timeline of the Anglophone Crisis (2022)
Timeline of the Anglophone Crisis (2023)

Anglophone Crisis 0
Anglophone Crisis